Dvori refers to the following places:

In Croatia:
Dvori, Croatia

In Slovenia:
Dvori, Koper, a settlement in the City Municipality of Koper
Dvori, Sveti Anton, a hamlet of Sveti Anton, Koper